Red Deer Forestry Airport  is located on Highway 734, on the banks of the Red Deer River, in extreme southern Clearwater County, west-southwest of Sundre, Alberta, Canada, on a line between Sundre and Lake Louise, although it is not close to either of these. There are no significant communities in its immediate area. It is not at all close to either the city of Red Deer or Red Deer County, but instead gets its name from the nearby Red Deer River.

See also
Red Deer Regional Airport

References

External links
Place to Fly on COPA's Places to Fly airport directory

Registered aerodromes in Alberta
Clearwater County, Alberta